The first season of Pakistan Idol premiered on Geo on 6 December 2013 (under the full title Pakistan Idol: Jo Hai Dil Ki Awaz) and continued until 24 April 2014. It was won by Zamad Baig. The first season was hosted by Mohib Mirza, while Anoushey Ashraf joined in semi-finals and also hosted the spin-off show Pakistan Idol-Sur Ka Safar.

The show follows the same Idols format comprising fourteen-weeks from auditions to semi-finals and grand finale. The show aired two weekly episodes at the 21:00 PST prime-time slot. The judges panel for the first season included Ali Azmat, Hadiqa Kiani and Bushra Ansari.

The first season set a record for gathering 1 million votes for finale. On 27 April 2014, Zamad Baig won the first season of Pakistan Idol, Muhammad Shoaib was the runner-up.

Regional Auditions

Audition took Place at following places, listing is in order of episode airing date:

In addition, Pakistan Idol auditions held at Hunza, Swat and Gwadar. The response of the people at auditions was hugely positive, around 20,000 plus people went out for audition, In Lahore due to the large number of auditionees the audition days extended two more days, the enthusiasm of people in Faisalabad and Multan was exceptionally extravagant. At Hunza, Swat and Gwadar auditions took place where a majority of girls appears for audition, In Sukhur, Hyderabad and Karachi auditions took place for three days.

Clear Last Chance Auditions
Pakistan Idol shows extravagant and sterling attainments, the Presenter and major sponsor of the series CLEAR offers another last chance for online auditions on its official Facebook page for the people who missed the chance to get auditioned. A port block was set open from 26 October 2013 to 8 November 2013 on page to post a five minutes video and audio clips of the singing of desired auditionees. Previous auditionees were also able to take part once again. Online selected contestants names were posted on a Facebook page after selection and CLEAR called them to Karachi for final selection. Through this procedure a total of 12 contestants was selected from which a total of five was finalized by the series judges.

Audition Structure

There are usually three stages in the audition process in every season, the first round being the open call audition advertised. Desired auditionees register themselves via SMS, and then called for audition at the venue, each person registered sings briefly in front of the judges, with those who gain at least two yeses from the three judges then receiving a Golden Ticket to Karachi. In the second round all the selected participants are brought to Karachi, for final auditions, where they first sing in a group of four or five in front of judges.  Most of those who attended are eliminated at this stage with only a limited number of auditionees selected to proceed further. In the Third round selected participants have to sing in duos and trios. Here further selection occurs and more participants drop out.  Only the final 30 made their way to the semi-finals round with the last final 12 or 13 selected for the game race and then this will be the only phase of the game where the audience select the fate of final contestants.

In the first season, the second and third stage of the audition took place within a single day, but in the following seasons each stage of the audition may take place on separate days. The initial audition venue need not necessarily be the final audition venue in front of the judges, and in later seasons, up to three separate venues may be used for the auditions in each city. The venues and dates of the second audition in front of the producers are not specifically listed in these pages.

Theater Round

Groups Performance
After the regional auditions, 86 contestants were selected to perform in Karachi in a series of rounds designed to eliminate further singers and narrow the pool. The first theatre round involved group performances where a selected group of four to five contestants was asked to sing in front of the judges, albeit individually and not as a group. From amongst these contestants, the pool of contenders was narrowed down to 35 contestants. The selected contestants were asked to perform the next day in the second theatre round – the duets and trios.

Duo's and Trio's
The rest of the best 35 advanced singers sung duos and trios in front of judges, in order to check their coordination and ability to sing with partners.  A series of auditions occur, where fewer contestants made their way to the last and final round of theater.

Solo performance with Music Track
The selected contestants from previous rounds enter into the third and final phase, where they have to perform as a solo performer with a music track. A series of performances occur and judges selected the final top 24 contestants for the piano round.

Top 24 Contestants

The following 24-Top Semi-finalist were selected from a total of 86. These contestants enter into Semi-final stage where the top 24-finalists will compete to reach a place of the final 12-Contestants, and from them the winner of the show will declared. One of the Top 24 contestants Nazish walks out due to her father's deteriorating health condition therefore eliminated contestant, Ghazal Ali, was selected to replace Nazish in the top 24.

Semi-finalists

Following is the list of semi-finalists who failed to reach the finals:

Semi-finals
The contestants who reached this stage called Piano Round were referred to in the show as the Top 24 finalists. As of this season, the contestants performed in front of a small studio audience, with orchestra accompaniment on backing tape, in a group of eight.  From each three groups of eight contestants, three contestants were selected on the basis of audience votes and one selected by judges' choice, by providing a last chance performance of any two contestants from the eliminated ones, while the rest of the contestants are eliminated periodically.

From the Top 24, 13 contestants competed for the finals.

Group 1

Group 2

Group 3

Wild Card Round

Following those 12 singers advancing on Sunday, 26 January, eight of the remaining 12 eliminated semi-finalists were selected by the judges to compete in the Wild Card Round. Wild Card round began the next week after the announcement of twelve finalists. Following another performance by each Wild Card contender, the audience votes selected ONE contestant to advance to the final group of 13.

Finalists

: Ages provided above against each contestant is their age during the season, all ages are confirmed from reliable source.

Finals
As of first season, maintaining the Idol series format, there are 14 weeks of the finals and 13 finalists, with one finalist eliminated per week based on the Pakistan public's votes. Friday day of the series is of performance day and Sunday day of series is results day for each contestant who had perform.

Kashif Ali was announced as a 13 finalists among the chosen wildcard by Judges, after achieving highest public votes.

Top 13 – 60s and 70s Hits of Pakistani Music

On 7 February 2014, the final race of the series started between 13 finalists, starting with the first week, the theme set as Retro Music of Pakistan, all the contestants performed 1970s and 60s hit songs of Pakistani Legends of Music like Ahmad Rushdi, Mehdi Hassan, Noor Jehan, Masood Rana and Naseem Nazli. As a result, from the Bottom 3, whoever received the fewest votes is eliminated. Mehwish Maqsood, Waqas Ali and Shoaib received minimum votes and are in the Bottom 3, among them Mehwish was voted out due to receiving the fewest votes.

 Adieu Performance by Mehwish Maqsood: "Kya Hal Sunawan Dil Da"

Top 12 – Love

All the Top 12 performed by following theme which was set as Love theme on the occasion of Valentines Day. Waqas Ali eliminated by facing public votes among Sana Zulfiqar and Waqas ALi Vicky in bottom 3. Eradication of Waqas leaves a huge impact on public votings image, judge Bushra Ansari enlighten the criticism they faced by public and criticized public voting titanically in negative response.

 Adieu performance by Waqas Ali: "Tarap Tarap ke Is Dil Se"

Top 11 – Pakistani Pop Music

All the contestants performed on the theme Pakistani pop music of 90s and present direction. Top 11 contestants sang songs from the hit albums of Pakistani pop singers. Pop rock singer Goher Mumtaz appears on sets in order to promote his serial Uff Yeh Mohabbat and to encourage the contestants.  Syed Sajid Abbas is eliminated after getting lower votes than Sana Zulfiqar and Zammad Baig. 
 
 Guest Mentor: Sajjad Ali

 Adieu performance by Syed Sajid Abbas: "Maa"

Top 10 – Songs of Memories

All the participant give tribute to Pepsi-a leading sponsor of Pakistani reality competitions since 90s. With the theme being set, contestants had to perform the songs of their memories. Sana, Shamir and Rose were put in the danger zone as Bottom 3 having fewer votes than the others.  Sana is eliminated after facing public votes while Shamir and Rose join the Top 9.

 Adieu performance by Sana Zulfiqar: "Mere Maula Karam Ho Karam"

Top 9 – Party Music

All contestants performed on a theme of Party Music. Alamgir was a guest mentor for week five. Asad Raza Suno, Shamir and Zammad comes in danger zone and Asad is eliminated after facing public votes, his unexpected elimination leave a huge impact on show format.

 Guest Mentor: Alamgir Haq

 Adieu performance by Asad Raza Sonu: "Main Dhondne ko Zamane"

Top 8 – Their Personal Idol

The Top 8 performed songs of their Personal Idols by giving tribute to their undeniable works. Waqas Vicky, Asad Zaidi and Shamir face the Bottom 3 while Shamir gets eliminated after achieving fewer votes than Ali Asad.

 Guest Mentor: Raheem Shah

 Adieu performance by Shameer Aziz Quidwai: "Ab Ye Jana Kyun Ye Rang"

Top 7 – National Songs

Top 7 performed patriotic songs of country in order to celebrate the یوم پاکستان, a historic resolution of Pakistan, occurred at 23 March 1940. Waqas is eliminated subsequently after facing public votes.

 Adieu performance by Waqas Ali Vicky: "Yaad Piya Ki Aayi"

Top 6 – Judge's Choice

Top – 6 performed songs of Judges choices, Band Strings was invited as a guest mentor for the contestants. Rafay is eliminated after getting the fewest votes.

 Guest Mentor: Bilal Maqsood, Faisal Kapadia and Zoe Viccaji

 Adieu performance by Abd-ul-Rafay Khan: "Ve Mahiya Tere Vekhan Nu"

Top 5 – Ali Zafar

All contestants performed Ali Zafar songs as per the selected theme. Rose and Kashif appear in the Bottom 2, after receiving the fewest votes, with Rose eliminated after having the lowest votes.

 Guest Mentor: Ali Zafar

 Adieu performance by Rose Mary: " Alvida Yaara Alvida "

Top 4 – Qawwali

Top 4, presented Qawwali theme, Sajjad Ali and Amjad Sabri were invited as a guest judge. Kashif is eliminated after having lower votes than Ali Asad.
 Guest Mentor: Sajjad Ali and Amjad Sabri
 

 Adieu performance by Kashif Ali: "Ho Kadi Aaa Mil Sawal Yar We"

Top 3 – Bhangra / Classical 

Top 3 performed on two being set theme challenges, Abrar and the members of Fuzön band Khurram Iqbal Shallum Asher Xavier and Imran Momina were the guest mentors for given challenges. 
 
 Guest Mentor: Abrarul Haq 
 

 Adieu performance by Syed Ali Asad Zaidi: "Tum Jo Milgaye Ho"

Top 2 – Contestant Choice Medleys & Final Performance

Pakistan Idol Pre-Finale's, Top-2 contestants performed, medleys and their own choice final performance. On the basis of Public voting, Zamad beats Shoaib and became the first winner of Paksiatn Idol season 1.

 Guest Mentor: Sajjad Ali and Tina Sani

Elimination details

Elimination chart

Bottom 3 and Bottom 2 Count

 In above bottom three count table, all the contestants danger zone history is provided, in each column third Bottomed 3 represented by a grey header line pointing that particular contestant eliminates periodically.

Clear Moment of the day

With the Race of TOP 10 finalists, series has started shown Clear Moment of the Day performance at the end of show, which represents the best, energetic, and soulful performance by a contestants and well received by Judges.

Controversies
From the inception of show, back in 2007, Pakistan Idol faces many problems and immense negative response by audience which leads to stop the production of franchise, it then took six years to handle all the problems and show finally went on air in late 2013. Owing to the production with linearly, shows became icon of the year, all the perceptions went wrong and series garnered millions views.

Voting Trend
After the selection of 24 semi-finalist race begins to reach at place of Top 13, and the fate of 24 contestants to winner was put on audience by public voting. With the Top 13, contestants like Mehwish, Waqas and Sajid which had been consistent throughout the show were eliminated after facing public votes, this affects and arise many questions on voting system, Judges were left mournful and doleful with the departure of consistent singers, therefore, production of series overviews the voting system and announce that an individual with one number can give maximum 25 Votes only to contestants, above 25 votes no vote will be counted and also one message cost only Rs. 0.50 Paisa + Tax.

Maria Meer Rejection
During the auditions, show went through the limelight of controversial happening, when in Faisalabad auditions a young girl Maria Meer was rejected by all three judges on course of the immaturity and lean voice of her. The audition episode went viral and a blog war started against judges. Maria became a sort of social media celebrity after her appearance on the show. Her rejection got too much attention that famous writer, broadcaster and journalist Raza Ali Abidi stated on his social networking site that: "A girl who is treated so badly in trials of show, i wish some channel with good producers must have done a great-show with her. I need your positive response!".

After much controversial act, aspiring singer-songwriter and producer Amanat Ali approaches to Maria Meer family and decided to launch a music video with her. In upcoming album of Amanat Aas, song Naina Lagay featuring Maria and himself was recorded, online release of Song got much acclaim and Amanat receives huge respect and acclaim. Maria was invited and approaches by many media personalities and has already done many interviews and programs.

References

External links
 
 

Pakistan Idol
2013 Pakistani television seasons
2014 Pakistani television seasons